is a Japanese actor and DJ. He was born in Aichi, Japan. His debut role was as Tsurugi Kamishiro, a.k.a. Kamen Rider Sasword, in Kamen Rider Kabuto.

Health
On July 10, 2020, he had been tested positive for COVID-19. A week later, his agency announced that he recovered from the virus.

Filmography

Television

Films

Dubbing
Cirque du Freak: The Vampire's Assistant (Darren Shan (Chris Massoglia))

References

External links
 
Yusuke FC—Official Website 

1988 births
Living people
21st-century Japanese male actors
Japanese male film actors
Japanese male television actors
Japanese male voice actors
Actors from Aichi Prefecture